Graham Clarke (10 July 1939 – 21 January 2006) was an Australian cricketer. He played six first-class matches for South Australia between 1965 and 1971.

See also
 List of South Australian representative cricketers

References

External links
 

1939 births
2006 deaths
Australian cricketers
South Australia cricketers
Cricketers from Adelaide